E.M.M.A was a Swedish girl group, mostly popular in Sweden. The group was founded by Keith Almgren who also wrote all the lyrics for their debut album. They have released three albums and eight singles. The group went on several small tours in Sweden. They came into existence in 2001 and officially broke up on 26 October 2005. The members were Elin Klingfors (born 25 December 1990), Martina Ståhl (born 1 December 1988), Mari-Linn Almgren Klevhamre (born 10 May 1992) and Alexandra Pettersson (born 22 February 1990).

Discography
Single "En hemlighet" - 2001
Single "Varje gång" - 2001
Album "E.M.M.A" - 2001
Single "Bubblar i mej" - 2002
Single "SMS" - 2002
Album "Vänner" - 2002
Single "Vi ska alltid vara vänner" - 2003
Single "Bamses födelsedagsvisa" - 2003
Single "Precis som du är" - 2004
Album "Tur & Retur" - 2004
Single "Sol, vind och vatten" - 2004

B-Tween
In the Spring of 2006, two of the former band members (Martina Ståhl and Alexandra Pettersson) formed a new group since the breakup of E.M.M.A. The group was named "B-Tween" and are labelled as singing pop/disco house/R&B style music. As of January 2008, "B-Tween" had two songs listed on their website, "Dangerzone" and "Reaching for the Stars". It is unknown when, or if, a release will be made by this group in the future.

References

External links
 Popgruppen E.M.M.A Official Website (Offline)
 Archive.org of E.M.M.A website as of 5/06

Swedish girl groups
Musical groups established in 2001
Musical groups disestablished in 2005